Madhyanepal is a municipality located in Lamjung District in Gandaki Province of Nepal. It is one of four municipalities located in Lamjung.

Madhyanepal reestablished on 10 March 2017 renaming the former Karaputar municipality merging with Neta VDC. The former Karaputar municipality was established in 2015, declaring Karapu Bazar the admin center.

The municipality is divided into 10 wards.

References

External links

Municipalities in Gandaki Province
Populated places in Lamjung District
Nepal municipalities established in 2015